Baccalaureate may refer to:

 Baccalauréat, a French national academic qualification
 Bachelor's degree, or baccalaureate, an undergraduate academic degree 
 English Baccalaureate, a performance measure to assess secondary schools in England
 European Baccalaureate, a bilingual educational diploma, awarded by a European School 
 French-German Baccalaureate, a secondary school diploma awarded by Deutsch-Französisches Gymnasium 
 International Baccalaureate, a non-profit foundation
 IB Diploma Programme
 Romanian Baccalaureate, Romania's national secondary-school diploma
 Spanish Baccalaureate, the post-16 stage of education in Spain
 Tunisian Baccalaureate, a national examination in Tunisia
 Welsh Baccalaureate Qualification, an educational qualification in secondary schools and colleges across Wales

See also

 Baccalaureate service, a Christian celebration that honors a graduating class